Frederick Edward McWilliam  (30 April 1909 – 13 May 1992), was a Northern Irish surrealist sculptor. He worked chiefly in stone, wood and bronze.

Biography
McWilliam was born in Banbridge, County Down, Ireland, the son of Dr William McWilliam, a local general practitioner. Growing up in Banbridge had a great influence on his work. He made references to furniture makers such as Carson the Cooper and Proctors in his letters to his friend, Marjorie Burnett.

He attended Campbell College in Belfast and later attended Belfast College of Art from 1926. After 1928, he continued to study at the Slade School of Fine Art in London. He originally intended to become a painter, but influenced by A.H. Gerrard, Head of Sculpture at the Slade and by Henry Moore whom he met there, he turned to sculpture. He received the Robert Ross Leaving Scholarship which enabled him and his wife (Beth Crowther) to travel to Paris where he visited the studio of Brancusi.

During the first year of the Second World War, he joined the Royal Air Force and was stationed in England  for four years where he was engaged in interpreting aerial reconnaissance photographs. He was then posted to India. While there he taught art in the Hindu Art School in New Delhi.

After his return from India, he taught for a year at the Chelsea School of Art. He was then invited by A. H. Gerrard to teach sculpture at the Slade. He continued in this post until 1968.

The 1950s saw him receive many commissions including the Four Seasons Group for the Festival of Britain exhibition in 1951. A major commission (1957) was Princess Macha for Altnagelvin Hospital, Derry. 

During the Northern Ireland Troubles he produced a series of bronzes (1972–73) known as  Women of Belfast in response to the bombing at the Abercorn Tea-Rooms

In 1964 he was awarded an Honorary Doctor of Letters from Queen's University Belfast. In 1966 he was appointed CBE and in 1971 he won the Oireachtas Gold Medal. McWilliam is represented in many public collections, including MOMA (New York) and Tate Britain. In 1984 the National Self-Portrait Gallery purchased a McWilliam self-portrait amongst acquisitions from fellow Northerners Brian Ballard, Brian Ferran and TP Flanagan.

The Arts Council of Northern Ireland organised a retrospective of his work in 1981 and a second retrospective was shown at the Tate Gallery in 1989 for his 80th birthday.
 
He continued carving up to his death. He died of cancer in London on 13 May 1992.

McWilliam's style of work consists of sculptures of the human form contorted into strange positions, often described as modern and surreal.

In September 2009 Banbridge District Council opened a gallery and studio dedicated to the work of and named after McWilliam.

See also
List of Northern Irish artists

References

External links

Profile on Royal Academy of Arts Collections
F. E. McWilliam website
Biography
Banbridge District Council

1909 births
1992 deaths
20th-century British sculptors
20th-century male artists from Northern Ireland
Alumni of the Slade School of Fine Art
British male sculptors
People from Banbridge
Royal Academicians
Sculptors from Northern Ireland
20th-century Irish male artists